Týnec is a municipality and village in Klatovy District in the Plzeň Region of the Czech Republic. It has about 400 inhabitants.

Administrative parts
Villages of Horní Lhota, Loreta and Rozpáralka are administrative parts of Týnec.

Gallery

References

Villages in Klatovy District